Enzo Coppini (18 April 1920 – 29 July 2011) was an Italian racing cyclist. He rode in the 1948 Tour de France.

References

External links
 

1920 births
2011 deaths
Italian male cyclists
Sportspeople from the Province of Pistoia
Cyclists from Tuscany